Emma Augusta Thomsen (7 August 1820, — 6 November 1897) was a Danish flower painter

Biography
Thomsen was born in Copenhagen, the daughter of the hotel owner Emanuel Thomsen and Anna Kirstine Ohlsen. She was introduced to flower painting by Johan Laurentz Jensen (1800–1856) but was self-taught in developing the art of painting flowers in their natural surroundings. In addition to exhibiting at Charlottenborg, she also presented her work in Stockholm and at the 1895 Copenhagen Women's Exhibition.

From 1844, she was a regular contributor to the Charlottenborg Spring Exhibition. She sold two of her paintings to the Royal Painting Collection.

In 1861,  she was awarded the Neuhausen Prize  for her En Kurv med Blomster i det frie.  The painting was subsequently bought by Count A.W. Moltke.

She died in Copenhagen and was buried at Holmen Cemetery.

References

External links
Paintings by Emma Augusta Thomsen on Artnet

1820 births
1897 deaths
19th-century Danish painters
19th-century Danish women artists
Artists from Copenhagen
Burials at Holmen Cemetery
Danish women painters